Tural Bayramli (born 7 January 1998) is an Azerbaijani professional footballer who plays as a midfielder for Azerbaijan Premier League club Sabail.

Club career
On 25 October 2016, Bayramli made his debut in the Azerbaijan Premier League for Sumgayit match against Gabala.

On 19 July 2020, Bayramli signed one-year contract with Zira FK.

On 15 September,Bayramli signed  one year contract with  S.F.K. Pierikos

References

External links
 

1998 births
Living people
Association football midfielders
Azerbaijani footballers
Azerbaijan youth international footballers
Azerbaijan under-21 international footballers
Azerbaijani expatriate footballers
Expatriate footballers in Latvia
Azerbaijan Premier League players
Latvian Higher League players
Sumgayit FK players
BFC Daugavpils players
Shamakhi FK players
Zira FK players
People from Sumgait